The Archives of Terror are a collection of documents chronicling some of the illicit activities undertaken by Paraguayan Dictator Alfredo Stroessner's secret police force. The documents have since been used in attempts to prosecute Chilean dictator Augusto Pinochet and in several human rights cases in Argentina and Chile. The collection of files proved the existence of Operation Condor - a CIA clandestine campaign of state terror and political repression in countries throughout Latin and South America. The documents were originally found on December 22, 1992, by lawyer and human-rights activist Dr. Martín Almada, and judge José Agustín Fernández, in a police station in Lambaré, a suburb of Paraguayan capital Asunción.

Overview 
Fernández was looking for files on a former prisoner. Instead, he found archives describing the fates of thousands of Latin Americans who had been secretly kidnapped, tortured, and killed by the security services of Argentina, Bolivia, Brazil, Chile, Paraguay, and Uruguay with cooperation of the CIA. This was known as Operation Condor.

The "terror archives" listed 50,000 people murdered, 30,000 people disappeared and 400,000 people imprisoned. Also revealed was a letter written by Manuel Contreras, head of the Chilean National Intelligence Directorate (DINA) at the time of writing, which invited Paraguayan intelligence officials to Santiago for a clandestine "First Working Meeting on National Intelligence" on 25 November 1975. This letter also placed intelligence chiefs from Argentina, Bolivia and Uruguay at the meetings, additionally solidifying those countries' involvement in the formation of Operation Condor. Other countries implicated in the archives include Colombia, Peru, and Venezuela, which cooperated, to various degrees, by providing intelligence information that had been requested by the security services of the Southern Cone countries.  Some of these countries have used portions of the archives, now in Asunción's Palace of Justice, to prosecute former military officers. Much of the case built against Chilean General Augusto Pinochet by Spanish judge Baltasar Garzón was made using those archives. Almada, himself a victim of Condor, was twice interviewed by Baltasar Garzón.

"[The documents] are a mountain of ignominy, of lies, which Stroessner [Paraguay's dictator until 1989] used for 40 years to blackmail the Paraguayan people," states Almada. He wants the UNESCO to list the "terror archives" as an international cultural site, as this would greatly facilitate access to funding to preserve and protect the documents.

In May 2000, a UNESCO mission visited Asunción following a request from the Paraguayan authorities for help in putting these files on the Memory of the World Register, one element of a program aimed at safeguarding and promoting the documentary heritage of humanity to ensure that records are preserved and available for consultation.

See also 
 List of archives in Paraguay

Notes

Bibliography 
 Martín Almada, Paraguay: The Forgotten Prison, the Exiled Country

External links 
 UNESCO "Democracy in the light of dictatorship" by Alain Touraine, article for the UNESCO.
 www.pittstate.edu
 Article in Spanish by Martín Almada
 "In Search of Truth and Justice: Coordination Board for Assistance to the Commission of Truth and Justice". Voces: Boletin Informativo de la CODEHUPY. 4(1) January–March 2004. Translated by D. Schenck-Hamlin and N. Ossar. Consequences of the discovery of the archives of terror.

Operation Condor
Classified documents
Dirty wars
Memory of the World Register
1992 in Paraguay
Enforced disappearance
Archives in Paraguay